Asim Saleem Bajwa  (Urdu,) is a retired Pakistani three-star general who served as the chairman of China-Pakistan Economic Corridor Authority from November 2019 to August 2021 and the special assistant to then Prime Minister Imran Khan on the Ministry of Information and Broadcasting from 28 April 2020 to 12 October 2020. On 11 December 2016, Bajwa was appointed as Inspector General Arms at GHQ, where he served until his appointment to the position of Commander Southern Command and XII Corps in September 2017. Previously, he also served as Director General of the ISPR from 2012 to 2016.

Education and background
Asim Saleem Bajwa was born in Saqibabad, Punjab. He belongs to the Bajwa sub clan of the Jatt tribe. He was commissioned in the 34th Punjab Regiment in 1984 after being passed out from the Pakistan Military Academy in Kakul. He graduated from the Command and Staff College in Quetta, as well as the National Defence University in Islamabad, followed by the Staff College, Camberley. He holds a master's degrees in war studies from National Defence University, Islamabad and defence studies from King's College London.

Military career

Bajwa held various command, staff, and instructional appointments.

During his military career, he served on multiple instructional and command-level posts, such as leading an anti-tank battalion, the 111th Infantry Brigade and an infantry division in erstwhile Tribal Areas where he played a key role in stabilization efforts during various operations.

He was a brigade major of an infantry brigade and served as Chief of Staff of a strike corps.

He instructed courses at PMA Kakul and the Command and Staff College, Quetta. General Bajwa has served as the deputy military secretary to the President of Pakistan. He assisted General Pervez Musharraf in compiling his book In the Line of Fire.

In December 2010, he was promoted to the rank of Major General.

On 4 June 2012, Bajwa was appointed as the director general of the Inter-Services Public Relations. On 22 September 2015, he was promoted to the rank of lieutenant general.

In December 2016, Bajwa was appointed Inspector General Arms (IG Arms) at General Headquarters where he served until 28 September 2017. In September 2017, he was appointed Commander Southern Command of the Pakistan Army where he served until 2019. He was instrumental in  numerous development initiatives in Balochistan.

He is the recipient of Hilal-i-Imtiaz (military) and Tamgha-e-Basalat.

Post-retirement career
In November 2019, after his retirement from the army, Bajwa was appointed as the chairman of the newly created CPEC Authority. Establishment Division notified Bajwa as chairman of the China-Pakistan Economic Corridor Authority for a tenure of four years. His duties in CPEC project especially his role to focus on development of Balochistan province is visible as Gwadar is emerging as an important regional trade hub.

In April 2020, Bajwa was appointed as Special Advisor to the Prime Minister (SAPM) on Information and Broadcasting. Later in an interview on 3 September 2020, Bajwa announced his resignation from his post as Special Advisor to the PM for Information and Broadcasting. However, prime minister Imran Khan refused to accept his resignation. On 12 October 2020, his resignation as SAPM was finally accepted by the Prime Minister.

Controversy 
During the All-Parties Conference held on 20 September 2020, the former prime minister of Pakistan Nawaz Sharif alleged that Asim Bajwa plotted to topple the Balochistan government while still in uniform and serving as Commander Southern Command. He was also responsible for introducing Balochistan Awami Party.

Personal life
A member of the Bajwa clan, Asim Bajwa is married to Farrukh Zeba and has three children with her and 4 grand children. His hobbies include reading and playing golf.

His sons are Muhammad Bajwa, Eusha Bajwa, and Azib Bajwa. Asim Bajwa has mentioned in his response to FactFocus report that his sons are graduates of US business schools.

Awards and decorations

See also

 Inter-Services Public Relations
 List of serving Generals of the Pakistan Army

References

External links

|-
 

Living people
Alumni of King's College London
Graduates of the Staff College, Camberley
National Defence University, Pakistan alumni
Pakistan Military Academy alumni
Academic staff of Pakistan Military Academy
Pakistani generals
Punjabi people
Recipients of Hilal-i-Imtiaz
Recipients of Tamgha-e-Basalat
Directors-General of the Inter-Services Public Relations
Punjab Regiment officers
People from Rahim Yar Khan District
Pakistani government officials
1968 births